Noah Knows Best is an American sitcom that aired on Nickelodeon from October 7 to December 17, 2000. The series was canceled with five unaired episodes out of thirteen produced, due to low ratings. The show starred Phillip Van Dyke as the title character, Noah. The show was recorded at Nickelodeon Studios in Orlando, Florida and was the last sitcom of its kind to be taped there as the concept was too outdated by its time of premiering. It was one of the last shows to premiere on Nickelodeon's Saturday Night block, SNICK.

History
The show only lasted for two months on Nickelodeon, from October to December 2000. The poor ratings resulted in the quick cancellation of the show. Creator Ken Lipman stated once in an interview that creative differences were the reason the show did not last long. As he says regarding the inspiration for the show:

Cast
Phillip Van Dyke as Noah Beznick
Rachel Roth as Megan Beznick
Marcia Strassman as Martine Beznick
Willie Green as Alton Martin
Stacy Meadows as D.J. Martin
Richard Kline as Jeff Beznick
 Robert Scism as Oliver Johnson

Episodes

References

External links
 

2000s Nickelodeon original programming
2000 American television series debuts
2000 American television series endings
2000s American teen sitcoms
English-language television shows
Television series about teenagers